Hydrochara soror is a species of water scavenger beetle in the family Hydrophilidae. It is found in North America.

References

Further reading

 

Hydrophilinae
Articles created by Qbugbot
Beetles described in 1980
Beetles of North America